Zhou Kexi, born 1942, is a Chinese translator of French literature.

Biography
Zhou gained a degree in mathematics from Fudan University. He acquired the French language and became interested in French literature while studying at École Normale Supérieure in Paris. He became a full-time literary editor in the 1980s, and has since then translated several French novels, including Les trois mousquetaires, Madame Bovary, and La Voie royale. He is currently making a new translation of Marcel Proust's À la recherche du temps perdu. The first volume, Du côté de chez Swann, was published in 2004. He has also rendered Aventures mathématiques by Miguel de Guzmán into Chinese.

References

External links
A Conversation between Zhou and François Cheng 
Fortunately not lost in translation
 Volumes of Passion and Patience

People's Republic of China translators
French–Chinese translators
Living people
20th-century Chinese translators
21st-century Chinese translators
Year of birth missing (living people)